This article is the list of international matches of the South Korea national under-23 football team from 2010 to 2019. Under-21 and under-22 games are also included in the list.

Results by year

Under-23 matches

2010

Source:

2011

Source:

2012

Source:

2013

Source:

2014

Source:

2015

Source:

2016

Source:

2017

Source:

2018

Source:

2019

Source:

Other matches

See also
 South Korea national under-23 football team results

References

External links
 Men's U-23 Squads & Results at KFA

2010